Christopher Wren B.D. (17 September 1589 – 29 May 1658) was an Anglican cleric who was Dean of Windsor from 1635 until his death, and the father of the prominent architect Christopher Wren.

Family
Christopher Wren Senior was the son of Francis Wren, a citizen and mercer of London, who served steward to Mary Queen of Scots during her captivity in England.

His mother was Suzanna Wiggington. His father was the only son of Cuthbert Wren, of Monk's-Kirby, in the county of Warwick, second son of William Wren, of Sherborne-House and of Billy-Hall in the bishopric of Durham. He was descended from an ancient family which came originally from Denmark. His parents lived in the parish of St. Peter’s Cheap in the City of London, and had three children: a daughter Anna, and two sons; Matthew, born 1585, and Christopher, born 1589. His brother Matthew preceded him as Dean of Windsor.

Christopher Wren married Mary Cox. Their son was the famed architect Sir Christopher Wren.

Career
He was educated at Merchant Taylors School, London, and St John's College, Oxford and graduated BA in 1609, MA in 1613, BD in 1620. In 1630 he was created Doctor of Divinity at Peterhouse, Cambridge, where his brother Matthew was president.

He was appointed:
Chaplain to Bishop Lancelot Andrewes
Chaplain to King Charles I, 1628
Rector of Fonthill Bishop, Wiltshire, 1620
Rector of East Knoyle, Wiltshire, 1623
Registrar of the Order of the Garter, 1634
Dean of Wolverhampton, 1639
Rector of Great Haseley, Oxfordshire, 1639

He was appointed Dean of Windsor in 1635. When Parliamentary forces occupied Windsor Castle, he refused to give the keys of the Chapel to Captain Fogg. Captain Fogg broke open the treasury and plundered it. Wren managed to preserve the records of the Order of the Garter, and King Edward III's sword.

Death 
Christopher Wren died at Bletchingdon, Oxfordshire on 29 May 1658.

Notes

Further reading 
 

1589 births
1658 deaths
Deans of Windsor
People educated at Merchant Taylors' School, Northwood
Alumni of St John's College, Oxford